Luis Vasquez may refer to:

 Luis Vasquez (American football) (born 1986), American football defensive linesman
 Luis Vásquez (footballer) (born 1996), Colombian football goalkeeper
 Luis Vasquez, better known by his stage name The Soft Moon, American musician

See also
 Luis Vázquez (disambiguation)
 Lucho (footballer, born 2003), born Luis Fernando Vásquez Díaz, Colombian football defender